Luis Donaldo Pineda Velasquez (born 28 December 1992) is a Mexican footballer who plays as a goalkeeper.

Biography
Born in Arcelia, Guerrero, Mexico, Pineda is known for his size (6'1) which allows him better agility and reach in goal. In his youth career he also stood out for being able to cut spaces on one-on-ones.

Professional

America

Pineda has been a member of America's youth system since 2008. Since 2012, he has made regular appearances for the team's U-20 team.

For the Apertura 2014 he was called up to the first team as one of the backups to starter Moisés Muñoz.

Honours
América
Liga MX: Apertura 2014
CONCACAF Champions League: 2014–15

References

1992 births
Living people
Footballers from Guerrero
Mexican footballers
Club América footballers
Association football goalkeepers